The Rugby Deanery is a Roman Catholic Deanery in the Roman Catholic Archdiocese of Birmingham. Comprising eight parishes (10 churches) in north and mid-Warwickshire, it is part of the Southern pastoral area.

Key personnel
As of 2015, the area bishop is the Rt Rev William Kenney and the area dean is Fr. Michael Gamble.

Parishes

References

External links
Deaneries of the Archdiocese of Birmingham
Archdiocese of Birmingham
Our Lady of the Sacred Heart & St. Francis of Assisi joint website
Our Lady of the Angels
Sacred Heart
St Anne's
St. Benedict's
St. Marie's

Roman Catholic deaneries in the Archdiocese of Birmingham
Religion in Warwickshire